Newville Township is one of fifteen townships in DeKalb County, Indiana. As of the 2010 census, its population was 558 and it contained 196 housing units.

Geography

Unincorporated towns
 Newville
 Newville Center
(This list is based on USGS data and may include former settlements.)

Major highways
  Indiana State Road 8

Cemeteries
The township contains two cemeteries: Evergreen and Riverside.

References
 United States Census Bureau cartographic boundary files
 U.S. Board on Geographic Names

External links

 Indiana Township Association
 United Township Association of Indiana

Townships in DeKalb County, Indiana
Townships in Indiana